T. R. Omana is an Indian actress in Malayalam films. She mainly acts in supporting roles and mother roles. She has acted in more than 500 films.

Personal life

T. R. Omana was born as eldest among five children to T R Gopala Pillai, Timber merchant and P K Meenakshiamma, a housewife in Alappuzha. She has four younger sisters Lalitha, Padmaja, Geetha and Lekha. She had education till Intermediate (pre university degree) which she did at Sanatana Dharma College, Alappuzha. She is a trained classical dancer. She is also a Kathakali artist and had given many stage performances. T R Omana never married.

Career

Her family shifted to Chennai when her father had a big loss in business and to fulfill her dream of becoming actress. She made her debut with Nallathanka, a Malayalam movie in 1950, as a child artist. She continued to act in few movies as child artist. She was the heroine of movie Puthradharmam in 1954. She acted in mother role for the first time at the age of 23 in Veluthambi Dalawa in 1954. In 1968, she acted in the first full-length comedy in Malayalam cinema Viruthan Shanku directed by P. Venu. She lent her voice to Sharada in almost all her movies in Malayalam. She has also dubbed for Lilly Chakravarthy, Waheeda Rehman, Srividya, Lakshmi, Shuba etc.  Tamil movie industry Nadigar Sangam honored her with Venthirevani for her contributions to movie industry.

Partial filmography

As an actress

Sarvopari Palakkaran (2017)
 Ente Priyapptta Muthuvinu (2000)
 Nishasurabhikal (2000)
 Megham (1999) as Ravivarma Thampuran's mother
 Friends (1999) as Padmini's grandmother
 Gloria Fernandes From U.S.A. (1998) as Ammachi
 Maasmaram (1997) as Darsan Das's mother
 Kannur (1997) as Sivankutty's mother
 Ishtadhaanam (1997) as Muthassi
 Sathyabhaamaykkoru Pranayalekhanam (1996) as Lakshmi
 Punnaaram (1995)
 Sargavasantham (1995) as Mariya
 Maanikyachempazhukka (1995)
 Vaardhakyapuraanam (1994) as Achamma
 Nandini Oppol (1994) as Sundari's mother 
 Saubhaagyam (1993)
 Samooham (1993) as Rajalekshmi's mother
 Porutham (1993) as Bavaniyamma
 Kizhakkan Pathrose (1992)
 Maanthrikacheppu (1992)
 Raajashilpi (1992)
 Vietnam Colony (1992)
 Kavacham (1992)
 Karppooradeepam (1991) as Unni's mother
 Ente Sooryaputhrikku (1991)
 Adholokam (1988)
 Bheekaran(1988)
 Achuvettante Veedu (1987)
 Ellaavarkkum Nanmakal (1987)
 Ente Shabdam (1986) as Rajan's mother
Ithramathram (1986) as Shanthamma
 Choodaatha Pookkal (1985)
 Yathra (1985)
 Aattuvanchi Ulanjappol (1984) as Murali's mother
 Visa (1983) as Shareef's mother
 Bandham (1983) as Gopi' mother
 Anandham Ajantham (1983)
 Ente Mohangal Poovaninju (1982)
 Saravarsham(1982) as Devakiyamma
 Ankachamayam (1982)
 Lahari (1982)
 Ponnum Poovum (1982) as Radha
 Priyasakhi Radhe (1982)
 Olangal (1982)
 Ammakkorumma(1981)
 Dwanthayudham (1981)
 Pathirasooryan (1981) as Devakiyamma
 Muthuchippikal (1980) as Bhargaviyamma
 Aniyatha Valakal (1980) as Ganesh's mother
 Karipuranda Jeevithangal (1980)
 Ishtamaanu Pakshe (1980)
 Chandrahaasam (1980)
 Prakadanam (1980) as Preethi's mother
 Sikharangal (1979)
 Nithya Vasantham (1979)
 Manavadharmam (1979)
 Manushyan (1979)
 Pennorumbattal (1979)
 Vijayam Nammude Senani(1979)
 Valeduthavan Vaalal  (1979)
 Allauddinum Albhutha Vilakkum (1979)
 College Beauty (1979)
 Indradhanussu (1979) as Janakiamma
 Vijayanum Veeranum (1979) as Aaya
 Sayoojyam (1979) as Madhavi
 Kanyaka (1978) as Bhavaniyamma
 Tharoo Oru Janmam Koodi (Thadavukaari) (1978)
 Kanalkattakal (1978) as Lakshmiyamma
 Kalpavriksham (1978) as Devakiyamma
Karimpuli (1978)
 Aval Viswasthayaayirunnu (1978) as Johny's Mother
 Vilakkum Velichavum (1978)
 Snehathinte Mukhangal (1978) as Doctor
 Rathinirvedam (1978)
 Priyadarshini (1978)
 Ashtamudikkayal (1978)
 Nithyavasantham (1978)
 Harshabashpam (1978) as Eliyama
 Pichipoo (1978)
 Theerangal (1978)
 Mattoru Karnan (1978)
 Hematharathri (1978)
 Mattoru Karnan (1978)
 Snehikkanoru Pennu (1978)
 Manoradham (1978)
 Gaandharvam (1978) 
 Anugraham (1977) as Kamakshiyamma
 Samudram (1977) as Kamalamma
 Pallavi (1977)
 Muttathe Mulla (1977) as Lakshmiyamma
 Abhinivesham (1977) as Devaki
 Rathimanmadhan (1977)
 Akshayapaathram (1977)
 Sreemad Bhagavadgeetha (1977)
 Ormakal Marikkumo (1977) as Thankamani
 Aayiram Janmangal (1976) as Cheriyamma
 Anubhavam (1976)
 Mohiniyattam (1976) as Nalini
 Maanasaveena (1976)
 Swapnadanam (1976) as Gopi's mother
 Chirikkudukka (1976)
 Themmadi Velappan (1976) as Bhavaniyamma
 Manishada (1975) as Karthyayani
 Chief Guest (1975)
 Kottaaram Vilkkaanundu (1975)
 Sooryavamsham (1975)
 Kalyaanappanthal (1975)
 Love Letter (1975)
 Padmaraagam (1975)
Chattambikkalyaani (1975) as Sethutty
 Ayodhya (1975)
 Alibabayum 41 Kallanmaarum (1975) as Naseema Begam
 Panchathanthram (1974) as Gayathri Thampuratti
 Night Duty (1974) as Devakiyamma
 Bhoogolam Thiriyunnu (1974)  as Gouriyamma
 Thacholi Marumakan Chandu (1974) as Maakkam
 Ayalathe Sundari (1974) as Saraswathiyamma
 Arakkallan Mukkaalkkallan (1974) as Gouriyamma
 Chandrakaantham (1974) as Teacher
 Raajahamsam (1974) as Nanukuttans Mother
 Sapthaswarangal (1974) as Omanayamma
 Jeevikkan Marannu Poya Sthree (1974)
 Alakal (1974)
 Kaamini (1974) as Lakshmi
 Pattabhishekam (1974) as Devaki
 Maadhavikkutty (1973) as Kunjulakshmiyamma
 Soundarya Pooja (1973)
 Kaliyugam (1973) as Karthyayaniyamma
 Interview (1973) as Shankari
 Manushyaputhran (1973)
 Azhakulla Saleena (1973) as Chinnamma
 Udayam (1973) as Lakshmikutty
 Manassu (1973)
 Aphala (1973)
 Football Champion (1973) as Soudamini
 Thottavadi (1973) as Bhagiradhiyamma
 Nakhangal (1973) as Pankiyamma
 Sasthram Jayichu Manushyan Thottu (1973) as Devakiyamma
 Bhadradeepam (1973) as Lakshmiyamma
 Maaya (1972) as Easwari
 Brahmachaari (1972)
 Akkarapacha (1972) as Mariya
 Miss Mary (1972) as Gouri
 Naadan Premam (1972) as Paaru
 Ananthasayanam (1972)
 Mayilaadumkunnu (1972) as Rosamma
 Sneehadeepame Mizhi Thurakku (1972) as Mary Fernandez
 Ummachu (1971)
 Thettu (1971) as Thankamma
 Puthen Veedu (1971)
 Sumangali (1971) as Lilly Simon
 Shiksha (1971) as Thankamma
 Karakanakadal (1971) as Akku Chedathi
 Makane Ninakku Vendi (1971) as Eali
 Oru Penninte Katha (1971)
 Anaadha Shilpangal (1971) as Kamalamma
 Poompaatta (1971) as Devaki
 Vilaykku Vaangiya Veena (1971) as Nirmala Menon
 Vimochanasamaram (1971)
 Rathri Vandi (1971) as Lakshmiyamma
 Kochaniyathi (1971) as Kamalamma
 Ambalapraavu (1970) as Subhdara Thampuratti
 Mindaapennu (1970) as Dakshyayani
 Nilakkatha Chalanangal (1970)	
 Nishaagandhi (1970)
 Ezhuthaatha Kadha (1970) as Mrs. Nair
 Aa Chithrashalabham Parannotte (1970)
 Naazhikakkallu (1970)
 Kuttavaali (1970) as Radhakrishnan's Mother
 Moodalmanju(1970) as Madhaviyamma
 Nadhi (1969) as Mariya
 Virunnukari (1969) as Surendran's mother
 Veettu Mrugam (1969)
 Padicha Kallan (1969) as Bharathiyamma
 Kumarasambhavam (1969) as Avvayyar
 Janmabhoomi (1969) as Mariya
 Velliyazhcha (1969) as Parvathiyamma
 Kannoor Deluxe (1969)
 Vilakkappetta Bandhangal (1969)
 Agnipareeksha (1968) as Shankari
 Padunna Puzha (1968) as Bhavaniyamma
 Velutha Kathreena (1968) as Dr. Sainabha
 Vidyaarthi (1968)
 Bhaaryamaar Sookshikkuka (1968) as Devaki Amma
 Vazhi Pizhacha Santhathi (1968)
 Viruthan Shanku  (1968) as Kalyanikuttyamma
 Sahadharmini (1967)
 Madatharuvi (1967)
 Pareeksha (1967) as Bhageeradhi 
 Mulkkireedam (1967)
 Sheelavathi (1967) as Anasooya
 Chithramela (1967)
 Agniputhri (1967) as Muthassi
 Postman (1967)
 Kudumbam (1967)
 Thalirukal (1967)
 Balyakalasakhi (1967)
 Ollathu Mathi (1967)
 Ashwamedham (1967) as Mohanan's Mother
 Jeevikkaan Anuvadikkoo (1967)
 Kadamattathachan  (1966)
 Station Master (1966) as Pappadakkari
 Sthanarthi Saramma (1966) as Ealikutty
 Kallippennu (1966)
 Rowdy (1966) as Sreedeviyamma
 Kayamkulam Kochunni (1966) as Ayyappan Nair's wife
 Porter Kunjali (1965) as Kunjipathumma
 Shyamala Chechi (1965) as Padmavathi
 Kochumon (1965) as Annamma
 Devaalayam (1964)
 Aadya Kiranangal (1964) as Pennukunju
 Anna (Old) (1964)
 Swargarajyam (1962)
 Puthiya Aaksham Puthiya Bhoomi (1962)
 Veluthambi Dalawa (1962) as Rebecca
 Seetha (1960) as Malini
 Naadodikal (1959)
 Newspaper Boy (1955)
 Puthradharmam (1954) as Leela
 Manasaakshi (1954) as Sarala
 Sandehi (1954) as Sudha
 Ponkathir (1953)
 Sheriyo Thetto (1953)
Lokaneethi (1953)
 Premalekha (1952)
 Rakthabandham (1951) as Kanchana
 Omana (1951)
 Chechi (1950)
 Sasidharan (1950)
 Nalla Thanka (1950)

As a singer

 "Udayatharaka Pole" - Mattoru Seetha (1975)
 "Kamini Mouliyam" - Mattoru Seetha (1975)
 "Nin Padhangalil" - Nazhikakkallu (1970)
 "Pandoru Shlipi" - Hotel Highrange (1968)

As a dubbing artist (Partial list)

Television

 Manasi (Doordarshan) 
 Snehaseema (Doordarshan) 
 Pennurimai (Doordarshan) 
 Kazhcha (Surya TV)
 Nirmalayam (Asianet)
 Ninavugalae Neengividu (DD Podhigai) 
 Chandanamazha (Asianet) as Mahathiyamma
 Deivam Thandha Veedu (Star Vijay) as Annapoorani -Tamil
 Rani Maharani (Reality Show)
 Kanmani (Sun TV Tamil)

Awards
Honour by Nadigar Sangam with  "Venthirevani"
Honour by Friends of Arts& Cultural Entertainments (FACE Dubai) - "Thriveni Sangamam" 2013
Flowers TV Awards 2015- Life Time Achievement Award ( Chandanamazha)
Asianet Television awards 2016 - Life Time Achievement Award ( Chandanamazha)
Honour by Kerala State Film Awards 2019

References

 ActressT R Omana in On Record8th May 2013 Part 1 ടി ആര്‍ ഓമന
 CiniDiary

External links

 T. R. Omana at MSI

Actresses in Malayalam cinema
Actresses from Alappuzha
Indian film actresses
Living people
Indian television actresses
Actresses in Malayalam television
Actresses in Tamil television
Indian voice actresses
20th-century Indian actresses
21st-century Indian actresses
Indian child actresses
Child actresses in Malayalam cinema
Year of birth missing (living people)
Malayalam playback singers